is a 2017 cyberpunk Japanese anime television series produced by Sanzigen. The anime was announced through a teaser video on August 7, 2016. followed by the official website on January 26, 2017. The series is produced by Sanzigen and directed by Goro Taniguchi, and aired from April 9, 2017, to June 25, 2017. The series is set when humanity has developed I-Machines, robots that can operate in extreme environments in space, in which the human pilot's consciousness can be transferred into the robot's operating system. An astrogeology student named Maya Mikuri joins the Excavate Company, a crew who illegally mine for the new mineral Orichalt, which is used for interstellar travel. However, Maya soon learns about a crew member with no identity named Ido, and his connection to a little girl named Alice found inside an Orichalt deposit within the core of the wandering planet known as Rajeev.

Plot
In the distant future, the discovery of the new mineral  has allowed humanity to expand beyond the Solar System. On the constant lookout for Orichalt, humanity has developed , giant robots that can operate in extreme environments. I-Machines function by using Orichalt to transfer the human pilot's consciousness into the robot's operating system; in that sense, the human becomes the machine. While Alliance Academy student Maya Mikuri is in the middle of operating an I-Machine, she gets involved in an incident with mining pirates, and ends up serving as a crew member on their mining spaceship. Soon after, she and the rest of the crew begin to discover that the government has been hiding secrets about destructive forces concerning Orichalt. Worse, these same forces are on the verge of destroying human civilization, and the crew might be the only ones who can stop them.

Characters

Excavate Company
The  is a band of Orichalt miners who often act illegally, being compared to space pirates. Their base of operations is the mining ship  (Latin for "foolish"), which is built to accommodate I-Machines and is equipped with four large manipulator arms featuring various tools. The ship is capable of utilizing Orichalt chunks to achieve faster than light warp-based travel through a process known as Miguel Jumping (probably referencing the Alcubierre Drive proposed by Mexican Physicist Miguel Alcubierre). Existing as an Evertrancer, willingly or otherwise, is noted to be illegal and highly unethical within galactic society.

A student at the Planet Alliance Academy with a knack for astrogeology. After an accident, she finds herself working with the members of Excavate. Keen and sharp-witted, but also a little timid and willing to let events unfold around her. Having been framed for illegally sharing information about a large Orichalt deposit, she is forced to sign on with Excavate until she is able to clear her name. Her personal I-Machine is a generic civilian model, painted yellow, with no special features or weaponry. After the Rajeev incident is resolved, the charges against Maya are dropped and she returns to the Academy, occasionally helping Excavate with jobs.

A stoic and serious individual with a bold and reckless streak. His blue custom I-Machine body is armed with exploding throwing knives and is modeled after a ninja. His virtual avatar is identical to his I-Machine body. It is noted that Ido has no official records, from machine number to consciousness map, meaning he legally does not exist. Ido also suffers from amnesia, with no recollection of his true identity before becoming an Evertrancer. His first concrete memory is as a prisoner on an "exile ship," where highly dangerous criminals are imprisoned in immobile and unconscious I-Machine bodies. He inexplicably awakened with no memory or identity data and was alone with his mind for several years, only escaping when he suddenly Mind Tranced into his current body, which drifted in a capsule near the ship. Ido figures he was a prisoner for at least 20 years and has inhabited his current I-Machine body for seven years. Having no memories before awakening on the prison ship and thus no leads, he had since given up on trying to discover who he really is until Alice arrives. He initially experiences intense feelings of fear and guilt as well as fragments of memories whenever he is in Alice's presence for reasons he is unable to explain until he recalls a memory and recognizes her. From then on, he becomes highly protective of her, as she is the only known link to his past. Searching for Kain Arisugawa to demand answers, Ido encounters Addams, who reveals Ido is in fact Kain Arisugawa himself, stripped of his memories as part of Addams' plans to take his place using a clone body. Addams soon forces Ido into the clone body and returns his memories. Despite having his true identity and past returned to him, Ido rejects the name Kain Arisugawa and insists that he is now "Excavator Ido." While inhabiting the Kain clone body, Ido is shot by Addams. He reaches a Mind Trance pod and returns to his I-Machine body just as the clone dies, regarding the I-Machine as his "true" self and vowing that as Ido, he would stop Addams. Grayman gave him the name Ido from the designation "ID-0," referring to his lack of identity and memories.

A boisterous hotshot and womanizer, Rick was once a professional asteroid racing champion nicknamed the "Speed Star" before being paralyzed in an accident. Befitting his past and personality, his I-Machine body is a custom red model designed for speed and able to assume a jet-like configuration. He eventually reveals to Amanza that his consciousness is a virtual copy of the real Rick Ayer, who was declared brain dead and whose body was disposed of after the accident. He exists because of a backup system installed in asteroid racing vehicles, which allows a racer to calculate and react twice as fast as normal, essentially acting as their own copilot. Because he considers himself little more than a copy and struggles with wondering if he is even truly alive, Rick appears as his I-Machine body in a virtual space. In the aftermath of the Rajeev incident, it is implied that Rick begins a relationship with Amanza.

The group liaison and information broker, Karla inhabits a purple and white custom I-Machine modeled after the female form, featuring molded breasts and powerful scanning and data-gathering systems. Her avatar in a virtual space is that of her former human body, a mature blonde woman. Before joining Excavate, Karla was once a talented but arrogant fund manager in the space resources market and has been an Evertrancer for ten years. Two years prior to joining Excavate, Karla lost her human body in a partial warp event, where it is suddenly Miguel Jumped to an unknown location. Her body somehow ends up in Addams' possession in suspended animation, where he uses it as a bargaining chip to bring Ido and Alice to him. Addams returns her to her human body as promised, but she Mind Trances into her I-Machine one last time to protect Maya and Alice from Addams, where it is soon destroyed. In the final assault against the Rajeev, Karla uses a pink-hued civilian I-Machine, but it is quickly destroyed, returning her to her human body. After the Rajeev incident, Karla becomes the CEO of MT Industries and uses her wealth to help society.

The boss of Excavate and Stulti'''s captain, Grayman's I-Machine is a custom green and gray model with four extra sub-arms hidden in the shoulder armor. His avatar in a virtual space resembles his former human body, a tanned, well-built man. Grayman is a former United Planets Force captain who lost 740 crew members and a state of the art ship in an unknown incident. He gave himself the name "Grayman" because he considers "Jake Hojo" to be dead.

Part of the Excavate company and Grayman's daughter, she serves as an operator. She is the only crew member to have a human body and does not seem to have a personal I-Machine.

A member of an endangered species of small quadrupeds from the Cetus system, Fa-Loser inhabits a pink, rabbit-like I-Machine and behaves much like a dog. Before becoming an Evertrancer, it was used as an experimental animal by Kain Arisugawa. Its virtual avatar resembles its I-Machine body. Fa-Loser dislikes Rick for undisclosed reasons, but they seem to have reconciled in the wake of the Rajeev incident.

United Planets Force

A lieutenant in the United Planets Force Army stationed on the battleship  and assigned to the "83rd Reconnaissance-in-Force Company" with the call sign "Recon Zero One," Amanza participates in a shakedown intending to detain Excavate after they recover a peculiar Orichalt deposit. During Stulti's escape via a "Miguel Out" while in the Miguel Line, her I-Machine is caught in the area of effect and is separated from Marito. Maya manages to recover the pod containing her human body, which is also taken along in the jump, and brings it on board Stulti. Amanza reluctantly decides to cooperate with Excavate after a brief period of distrust, drawn to the many mysteries that surround them. According to Sam Taylor of the organization Observer, Amanza is wanted for desertion by the United Planets Force military because of the circumstances that led to her allying with Excavate. Amanza's personal I-Machine is a variant of a standard military model, colored purple and armed with a beam rifle. This body is destroyed during the final push to the Rajeev core, but is replaced by an identical model some time afterward. Amanza leaves the Army and remains with Excavate after the Rajeev incident, mostly because of her newfound relationship with Rick.

An admiral in the United Planets Force Army who leads the assault on the Rajeev.

Planet Alliance Academy

A professor of astrogeology and Maya Mikuri's former instructor. He betrays Maya and leaves her for dead when an excavation mission goes wrong and Excavate Company arrives, later framing her for illegally sharing information about the dig site.

Kinsberg's assistant, Romanov assists Kinsberg's plans when they abandon Maya and frame her.

Others

The creator of the Mind Trance system that allows for the use of I-Machines. It is later revealed that Addams Forte Chevalier took on Kain Arisugawa's identity several years ago and that Ido is the true Kain Arisugawa. Kain was an arrogant and egotistical man obsessed with gathering data, willing to intentionally sacrifice 90% of humanity for the sake of researching and controlling Orichalt and the wandering planets known as Rajeev, which are ancient alien constructs that hunt down Orichalt. He secretly uses Alice, the terminally ill daughter of colleague Jennifer Record, as a test subject in order to create an "Orillian" as part of this plan. Kain's utter lack of regard for human life and the revelation that Alice's fate was intentional causes his longtime friend Addams to snap and force him into an intentionally flawed Mind Trance, stripping his memories and imprisoning him in an immobile I-Machine body. However, Kain had a contingency plan in place to deliver a specially designed I-Machine that completely lacked identification data specifically to recover his consciousness with the designation "ID-0." As Ido many years later, he encounters Addams again, who returns his memories, though Ido rejects his past life as Kain Arisugawa. Through Kain's memories, Ido realizes that the Rajeev adapt and evolve, making it impossible to permanently defeat them and that the true solution is mutual understanding.

A man with albinism wearing a golden mask who is often seen observing the events surrounding Excavate and the wandering planet Rajeev. His body is actually the third clone of Kain Arisugawa's body, which he refers to as "Triwaker," and he has taken Kain's identity for his own, occasionally transferring his mind to clones of Kain to remain young. He possesses a custom white and gold I-Machine modeled after a knight, featuring an energy cape and human-like face and armed with a scepter-like weapon. Addams' mask is a state-of-the-art portable Mind Trance device, which allows him to Mind Trance without needing to use a standard pod. Addams was once Kain Arisugawa's closest friend and colleague, but the incident that led to Alice becoming an Orillian drove him to madness. He intends to use Alice to stop or control the Rajeev and force Kain, now Ido, to atone for his sins. He enacts his plan by creating multiple artificial Orillian clones of himself and using them as warheads, injecting his consciousness like a virus into the Rajeev, not realizing they are capable of adapting. Addams also possesses his original body, which he transfers to after being defeated in battle with Ido. He also possesses another portable MT System device in the shape of a pistol which is aimed at the head and fired, killing his human body at the moment of transfer. In a last-ditch effort to control the amassed Rajeev, Addams Mind Trances with the Orichalt core, reuniting with both Alice and Jennifer. He has one last conversation with Ido before fully merging with the Rajeev consciousness, acknowledging that Kain Arisugawa is truly gone and addressing Ido by name for the first time, thanking him for everything.

A young girl who suddenly appeared out of a peculiar Orichalt deposit brought on board Stulti''. She appears as a human girl around four years of age wearing catgirl accessories and possessing a playful, curious demeanor. She is, however, apparently incapable of speech and her body chemistry is noted to contain more silicon than a normal human's. Ido initially experiences intense feelings of fear and guilt as well as flashes of fragmented memories whenever in her presence. After saving her from being spaced and captured by a Rajeev within an Orichalt cloud, Ido recalls a memory and identifies her as Alice, a young girl he apparently knew in the past. She is constantly surrounded by a self-repairing crystalline film of Orichalt, enclosing her body in an airtight layer that allows her to survive in a vacuum. She possesses the ability to control this film, able to extend it to partially cover another person. It is later revealed that Alice is a being known as an "Orillian," a human form shaped from Orichalt and inhabited by a human consciousness. Alice is the daughter of Jennifer Record, a colleague of Kain Arisugawa and Addams Forte Chevalier. As a human, she was afflicted with a terminal illness which made her physically weak. Kain developed a plan to permanently transfer her mind to an I-Machine to allow her to survive, but intentionally botched the Mind Trance process to fuse her consciousness with Orichalt, intending to use the resulting being to control the Rajeev. The new being Miguel Jumped to an unknown location, remaining undiscovered until Excavate recovers her years later. Alice's fragmented consciousness is eventually reunited within the Rajeev core, restoring her full personality and reuniting her with her mother.

An old man who frequently converses with Addams about various events. He believes the Rajeev wandering planets and Alice's appearance are because of Amatsu-Mikaboshi, the Shinto god of chaos. He is revealed to be part of a society of elites who achieve virtual immortality by transferring to young clone bodies just before death with the side-effect of losing a percentage of memories with each transfer. His organization wished to achieve true immortality by becoming Orillians. He is killed in an explosion just after transferring to a new body.

A member of the group , tasked with ensuring various space-faring organizations adhere to galactic treaties. He approaches Excavate promising to get them pardoned for all of their various crimes and clear Maya's name. This, however, is only a front to distract the crew long enough to attempt to kidnap Alice, intending to experiment on her. He possesses the strange ability to read someone's mind simply by making eye contact with them, even if they are operating an I-Machine. Through this ability, he is able to identify Ido as an "enemy of humanity" and seems to recognize him. He is killed by Rajeev fragments before Ido is able to get more information out of him. The crew of Excavate later determine that because of the physical similarities, Sam Taylor is potentially a clone of Kain Arisugawa, the creator of the Mind Trance system, a fact Addams later confirms.

Alice's mother and a former colleague of Kain Arisugawa and Addams Forte Chevalier. Alice's apparent death and disappearance during a Mind Trance experiment mentally and emotionally breaks her. Kain hints that Addams had some romantic attraction to Jennifer after Alice's disappearance, though Addams later reveals to Ido that Jennifer was attracted to Kain. Consumed by anguish, Jennifer Mind Trances in the same manner as Alice, merging her consciousness with Orichalt in order to search for her daughter within the Rajeev's collective consciousness. To this end, she connects with Alice's body, using it at a catalyst to restore her daughter's fragmented consciousness and joining together with her and Addams within the Rajeev.

An information broker who Karla often contacts for information regarding Orichalt locations.

An acquaintance of Urakuo Hakubi who briefly speaks with him after he transfers to a young clone body. She is killed in an explosion shortly after they converse.

Episode list

References

External links
Official website 
 at Netflix

2017 anime television series debuts
Anime with original screenplays
Mecha anime and manga
Netflix original anime
Sanzigen
Television shows written by Yōsuke Kuroda
Tokyo MX original programming